TVS Motor Company (commonly known as TVS) is an Indian multinational motorcycle manufacturer headquartered in Chennai. It is the third-largest motorcycle company in India in terms of revenue. The company has annual sales of three million units and an annual production capacity of over four million vehicles. TVS Motor Company is also the second largest two-wheeler exporter in India with exports to over 60 countries.

TVS Motor Company is the flagship company of the TVS Group, being the largest company of the group in terms of valuation and turnover. The logo for TVS Motor Company features a red horse.

History
T. V. Sundaram Iyengar began with Madurai's first bus service in 1911 and founded TVS, a company in the transportation business with a large fleet of trucks and buses under the name of Southern Roadways.

Early history
Sundaram Clayton was founded in 1962 in collaboration with Clayton Dewandre Holdings, United Kingdom. It manufactured brakes, exhausts, compressors and various other automotive parts. The company set up a plant at Hosur in 1976, to manufacture mopeds as part of their new division. In 1980, TVS 50, India's first two-seater moped rolled out of the factory at Hosur in Tamil Nadu, India. A technical collaboration with the Japanese auto giant Suzuki Ltd. resulted in the joint-venture between Sundaram Clayton Ltd and Suzuki Motor Corporation, in 1987. Commercial production of motorcycles began in 1989.

Suzuki relationship

TVS and Suzuki shared a one-year-long relationship that was aimed at technology transfer for design and manufacture of two-wheelers specifically for the Indian market. Re-christened TVS-Suzuki, the company brought out several models such as the Suzuki Supra, Suzuki Samurai, Suzuki Shogun and Suzuki Shaolin. In 2001, after separating ways with Suzuki, the company was renamed TVS Motor, relinquishing its rights to use the Suzuki name. There was also a 30-month moratorium period during which Suzuki promised not to enter the Indian market with competing two-wheelers.

Recent

Recent launches include the flagship model TVS Apache RR 310, the TVS Apache RTR 200, TVS Victor and TVS XL 100. TVS has recently won 4 top awards at J.D. Power Asia Pacific Awards 2016, 3 top awards at J.D. Power Asia Pacific Awards 2015 and Two-Wheeler Manufacturer of the Year at NDTV Car & Bike Awards (2014–15).

In early 2015, TVS Racing became the first Indian factory team to take part in the Dakar Rally, the world's longest and most dangerous rally. TVS Racing partnered with French motorcycle manufacturer Sherco, and named the team Sherco TVS Rally Factory Team. TVS Racing also won the Raid de Himalaya and the FOX Hill Super Cross held at Sri Lanka. In three decades of its racing history, TVS Racing has won over 90% of the races it participates in.

In 2016, TVS started manufacturing the BMW G310R, a model co-developed with BMW Motorrad after their strategic partnership in April 2013. In December 2018, the Hosur plant where the motorcycle is manufactured rolled out its 50,000th G310R series unit.

On 6 December 2017, TVS launched their most-awaited motorcycle, the Apache RR 310 in an event at Chennai. The 310 cc motorcycle with an engine which was co-developed with BMW features the first ever full fairing on a TVS bike, dual-channel ABS, EFI, KYB suspension kits, etc. It is expected to rival bikes like KTM RC 390, Kawasaki Ninja 250SL, Bajaj Pulsar and Dominar and Honda CBR 250R after hitting the market. The Apache RR 310 is designed and realised entirely in India.

On 17 April 2020, it has been reported that TVS Motor Company acquired Norton Motorcycle Company in an all cash deal. In the short term, they will continue the production of motorcycles at Donington Park using the same staff.

Characteristics of TVS Motor Company 

It was the first Indian company to deploy a catalytic converter in a 100 cc motorcycle and the first to indigenously produce a four stroke motorcycle. The list of firsts from the firm include: 
 India's first 2-seater moped – TVS 50
 India's first Digital Ignition – TVS Champ
 India's first fully indigenous motorcycle – TVS Victor
 India's first company to launch ABS in a motorcycle - Apache RTR Series
 Indonesia's first dual-tone exhaust noise technology – TVS Tormax
 India's first connected scooter which claims to be India's first Bluetooth Connected Scooter with features like Call Assistance, Navigation and Engine Killswitch - TVS NTORQ 
 India's First 125cc bike with 3 Valve Engine, Inverted TFT display with Gear Shift Indicator, Underneath Storage - TVS Raider 125.

Current models 
TVS NTORQ
TVS Scooty
TVS Jupiter
TVS Wego
Apache RTR Series
TVS RR 310
TVS Radeon
TVS Sport
TVS Star City Plus
TVS XL100
TVS iQube
TVS Raider 125
TVS Ronin 225

Awards and recognitions 

TVS Motor won the Deming Application Prize in 2002.

In the same year, the work done for the TVS Victor motorcycle made TVS Motor win the National Award for successful commercialization of indigenous technology from the Technology Development Board, Ministry of Science & Technology, Government of India. In 2004, TVS Scooty Pep won the 'Outstanding Design Excellence Award' from BusinessWorld magazine and the National Institute of Design, Ahmedabad.

The effective implementation of Total Productivity Maintenance practices gave TVS Motor the TPM Excellence Award, given by the Japan Institute of Plant Maintenance in 2008.

The company's Chairman Emeritus, Venu Srinivasan, was conferred with an honorary Doctorate of Science degree by the University of Warwick, United Kingdom in 2004, while the Government of India honoured him with Padma Shri, one of India's highest civilian distinctions in 2010.

Innovative implementation of Information Technology has won TVS Motor the Ace Award for Most Innovative NetWeaver Implementation in 2007, awarded by technology major SAP AG, and the Team Tech 2007 Award of Excellence for Integrated use of Computer-aided engineering Technologies.

Himalayan Highs, an initiative launched by TVS Motor Company has been included in the India Book of Records when Anam Hashim became the first woman on a 110 cc scooter to complete the trip to Khardung La, the world's highest motorable stretch.

During an episode of The Grand Tour, Richard Hammond bought a brand new TVS Star HLS 100 cc "for £800" and used it to complete the Feed the world challenge, transporting fish 200 miles from Maputo to Bingo. During the journey, the bike performed beyond the presenter's expectations, prompting the normally motorbike-critical Clarkson to comment, "That Ewan McGregor travelled the world on a BMW GS – why didn't he just get one of these?"

References

External links
 

Motorcycle manufacturers of India
Vehicle manufacturing companies established in 1978
Manufacturing companies based in Chennai
Scooter manufacturers
Indian companies established in 1978
Indian brands
TVS Group
1978 establishments in Tamil Nadu
Companies listed on the National Stock Exchange of India
Companies listed on the Bombay Stock Exchange